Tulku Jigme Chhoeda (born 22 August 1955) became the 70th Je Khenpo (Chief Abbot of The Central Monastic Body) of Bhutan in 1996, and became the longest-serving holder of the office.

Early life and education 
Born to Yab Rinzin Dorji and Yum Kuenzang Choden in Lhuentse on 22 August 1955, Jigme Chhoeda was recognized as the reincarnation of Geshey Pema Tshering, the learned sage of Tharpaling in Bumthang.

Jigme Chhoeda joined Druk Sanga Chhoeling Monastery in Darjeeling, India, at the age of eight. He was ordained as a monk with commitment from Drukpa Thuksey Rinpoche and then studied under Khenpo Sonam Darge and Khenpo Noryang. Later, he studied under Dudjom Rinpoche in India.

At the age of 15, he returned to Bhutan and studied at the Tango Drupdey in Thimphu under the 68th Je-Khenpo Ngawang Tenzin Dhondup. He received the complete initiations and teachings of the Drukpa Kagyu tradition and Dzogchen (the highest realization). He mastered the Mahamudra practices, the meditation of Naro Choedrug (the six circles of Ro-Nyom Kordrug). Tulku also studied language and literature and the 13 different philosophical texts under the 69th Je-Khenpo Geshey Genduen Rinchen.

Meditation and retreat 
Jigme Chhoeda completed Losum Choesum three times, a meditation retreat of 3 years, 3 months, and 3 days.

Major positions held 
Tulku was appointed as the head of Tango Monastery and taught language and Buddhist philosophy. In 1986, he was appointed as the Drapoi Lopen of the Central Monastic Body, and resigned in 1990. In 1995 Fourth Dragon King Jigme Singye Wangchuck appointed him as the Dorji Lopen.

Honours 
  :
  The Royal Saffron Scarf (1996).
  Order of the Dragon King, First Class (18 December 2018).

References 

Tibetan Buddhists from Bhutan
Bhutanese lamas
Bhutanese Buddhist monks
Drukpa Kagyu lamas
1955 births
20th-century lamas
21st-century lamas
People from Lhuntse District
Living people